Venoix is a western quarter of Caen, in Calvados, France. It was an independent commune until 1952, when it merged with Caen. Venoix is over 300 years old. Its inhabitants still keep today a distinctly specific feeling of living in Venoix rather than in Caen.

References

Former communes of Calvados (department)